Regulatory technology, Abrv: RegTech, is the use of information technology to enhance regulatory and compliance processes. RegTech is most usefully applied to heavily regulated industries and activities such as financial services, gaming, healthcare, pharmaceutical, energy and aviation.  RegTech puts a particular emphasis on regulatory monitoring, reporting and compliance and aims to enhance transparency as well as consistency and to standardize regulatory processes, to remove ambiguity from regulations and provide higher quality outcomes at a lower cost.

RegTech to date has been focused on the digitization of manual reporting and compliance processes in the financial services industry, for example in the context of know your customer requirements, and is often mis-attributed as a subset of FinTech. Its application to wider industries, such as energy, confirm that RegTech is a subset of GovTech. 

RegTech offers significant cost savings to industry and regulators and a 2016 academic paper suggested that the potential of RegTech is far greater stating that "it has the potential to enable a close to real-time and proportionate regulatory regime that identifies and addresses risk while also facilitating far more efficient regulatory compliance". 

The report goes on to suggest that RegTech's transformative potential will only be fully captured by a new and different regulatory framework situated at the nexus of data and digital identity. The developments in FinTech, the tremendous changes in emerging markets, and the recent pro-active stance of regulators (for instance with the development of regulatory sandboxes), may potentially combine to facilitate a transition from one regulatory model to another.

Origin 
At a governmental level, the FCA was the first governmental body to establish and promote the term RegTech, defining this as: "RegTech is a sub-set of FinTech that focuses on technologies that may facilitate the delivery of regulatory requirements more efficiently and effectively than existing capabilities".

In March 2015, a report by the UK Government Chief Scientific Adviser, stated that "FinTech has the potential to be applied to regulation and compliance to make financial regulation and reporting more transparent, efficient and effective – creating new mechanisms for regulatory technology, RegTech".

Yet the vision of a technology led regime has already been proposed as early as 2014, by Andy Haldane, during a keynote address at Birmingham University

I have a dream. It is futuristic, but realistic. It involves a Star Trek chair and a bank of monitors. It would involve tracking the global flow of funds in close to real time (from a Star Trek chair using a bank of monitors), in much the same way as happens with global weather systems and global internet traffic. Its centerpiece would be a global map of financial flows, charting spill-overs and correlations.

On the private sector side, two pressure points have facilitated the development of RegTech. On the expense side, post-crisis fines have exceeded US$200 billion, and the ongoing cost of regulation and compliance has become a primary concern industry-wide. On the revenue side, competition from FinTech companies is expected to put US$4.7 trillion of revenues at risk. These expense and revenue factors are driving the development of RegTech. As with FinTech, the 2008 GFC represented a turning point in the development of RegTech. However, the factors underlying, and the beneficiaries of, RegTech are quite different. FinTech growth has been led by start-ups (now increasingly partnering with, or being acquired by, banks and other traditional financial institutions), whilst RegTech developments to date are primarily a response to the huge costs of complying with new institutional demands by regulators and policy-makers.

For the financial services industry, the cost of regulatory obligations has dramatically increased, such that 87% of banking CEOs in one survey consider these costs as a source of disruption. This provides a strong economic incentive for more efficient reporting and compliance systems to better control risks and reduce compliance costs. Furthermore, the massive increases in the volume and types of data that have to be reported to regulatory authorities represent a major opportunity for the automation of compliance and monitoring processes. For the financial services industry, the application of technology to regulation and compliance has the scope to massively increase efficiency and achieve better outcomes.

References 

Financial regulation